The BSEC is an international economic organization.

BSEC may also refer to:

 Beaver Street Enterprise Center, an American small business incubator
 Bendigo South East College, an Australian secondary school
 Boyle Street Education Centre, a Canadian charter school
 Brightwater Science and Environmental Centre, a Canadian nature reserve